Qaf or QAF may refer to:

 Qāf (ق), a letter in the Arabic alphabet
 Qaf (sura) the fiftieth sura of the Qur'an
 Qaf (Khowar letter), in the Chitrali alphabet
 Ka with descender (Қ қ), a Cyrillic letter in the Kazakh, Uzbek, and Abkhaz alphabets
 Mount Qaf, a location in Arabic and Persian mythology.
 QAF FC, a football (soccer) club from Bandar Seri Begawan, Brunei
 QAF Limited, a company listed on the Singapore Exchange
 Qatar Amiri Flight, an airline
 Quality Air Force, a United States Air Force quality control program
 Queer Arts Festival an annual multi-disciplinary arts festival in Vancouver, British Columbia, Canada
 Queer as Folk (UK TV series) (1999–2000), a British television series
 Queer as Folk (2000 TV series) (2000–2005), a North American remake of the British series